KCSD (90.9 FM) is a National Public Radio member radio station licensed to Sioux Falls, South Dakota. It is owned by the South Dakota Board of Directors for Educational Telecommunications and is part of South Dakota Public Broadcasting's statewide network.

The station signed on in 1985 as part of SDPB's effort to improve coverage in the state's largest city. Previously, flagship station KUSD-FM only provided grade B coverage of Sioux Falls. The license was held by the University of Sioux Falls, but SDPB operated it under a longstanding management agreement. SDPB bought the station outright in December 2013. The purchase, at a price of $420,000, was consummated on February 10, 2014.

References

External links
 sdpb.org
 

CSD
NPR member stations
Radio stations established in 1985
1985 establishments in South Dakota